Jeanne may refer to:

Places
 Jeanne (crater), on Venus

People
 Jeanne (given name)
 Joan of Arc (Jeanne d'Arc, 1412–1431)
 Joanna of Flanders (1295–1374)
 Joan, Duchess of Brittany (1319–1384)
 Ruth Stuber Jeanne (1910–2004), American marimbist, percussionist, violinist, and arranger
 Jeanne de Navarre (disambiguation), multiple people
 Leon Jeanne (born 1980), Welsh footballer

Fictional characters
Jeanne, a character from the Bayonetta series of video games

Arts and entertainment
 Jeanne (1934 film), a French drama film
 Jeanne, also known as Joan of Arc, a 2019 French drama film
 Jeanne, an 1844 novel by George Sand

Other uses
 Tropical Storm Jeanne (disambiguation)

See also 

 Joan (disambiguation)
 Joanna
 Joanne (disambiguation)
 Jean (disambiguation)
 Jehanne (disambiguation)
 Gene (disambiguation)